The 1991–92 Georgia Southern Eagles men's basketball team represented Georgia Southern University during the 1991–92 NCAA Division I men's basketball season. The Eagles, led by 10th-year head coach Frank Kerns, played their home games at Hanner Fieldhouse in Statesboro, Georgia as members of the Trans America Athletic Conference. The team won the regular season conference title and the TAAC tournament to earn an automatic bid to the NCAA tournament. As the No. 15 seed in the Southeast region, the Eagles lost in the opening round to Oklahoma State, 100–73, to finish with a 25–6 record (13–1 TAAC).

Roster

Schedule and results

|-
!colspan=12 style=| Regular season

|-
!colspan=12 style=| TAAC Tournament

|-
!colspan=12 style=| NCAA tournament

Source,

References

Georgia Southern Eagles men's basketball seasons
Georgia Southern
Georgia Southern
Georgia Southern Eagles men's basketball
Georgia Southern Eagles men's basketball